Kelps are large brown algae seaweeds that make up the order Laminariales. There are about 30 different genera. Despite its appearance, kelp is not a plant - it is a heterokont, a completely unrelated group of organisms.

Kelp grows in "underwater forests" (kelp forests) in shallow oceans, and is thought to have appeared in the Miocene, 5 to 23 million years ago. They are known for their high growth rate—the genera Macrocystis and Nereocystis can grow as fast as half a metre a day, ultimately reaching .

Through the 19th century, the word "kelp" was closely associated with seaweeds that could be burned to obtain soda ash (primarily sodium carbonate). The seaweeds used included species from both the orders Laminariales and Fucales. The word "kelp" was also used directly to refer to these processed ashes.

Description
In most kelp, the thallus (or body) consists of flat or leaf-like structures known as blades. Blades originate from elongated stem-like structures, the stipes. The holdfast, a root-like structure, anchors the kelp to the substrate of the ocean.
Gas-filled bladders (pneumatocysts) form at the base of blades of American species, such as Nereocystis lueteana, (Mert. & Post & Rupr.) to hold the kelp blades close to the surface.

Growth and reproduction

Growth occurs at the base of the meristem, where the blades and stipe meet. Growth may be limited by grazing. Sea urchins, for example, can reduce entire areas to urchin barrens. The kelp life cycle involves a diploid sporophyte and haploid gametophyte stage. The haploid phase begins when the mature organism releases many spores, which then germinate to become male or female gametophytes. Sexual reproduction then results in the beginning of the diploid sporophyte stage, which will develop into a mature individual.

The parenchymatous thalli are generally covered with a mucilage layer, rather than cuticle.

Kelp forests

Kelp may develop dense forests with high production, biodiversity and ecological function. Along the Norwegian coast these forests cover 5800 km2, and they support large numbers of animals. Numerous sessile animals (sponges, bryozoans and ascidians) are found on kelp stipes and mobile invertebrate fauna are found in high densities on epiphytic algae on the kelp stipes and on kelp holdfasts. More than 100,000 mobile invertebrates per square meter are found on kelp stipes and holdfasts in well-developed kelp forests (Christie et al., 2003). While larger invertebrates and in particular sea urchins Strongylocentrotus droebachiensis (O.F. Müller) are important secondary consumers controlling large barren ground areas on the Norwegian coast, they are scarce inside dense kelp forests.

Commercial uses

Giant kelp can be harvested fairly easily because of its surface canopy and growth habit of staying in deeper water.

Kelp ash is rich in iodine and alkali. In great amount, kelp ash can be used in soap and glass production. Until the Leblanc process was commercialized in the early 19th century, burning of kelp in Scotland was one of the principal industrial sources of soda ash (predominantly sodium carbonate). Around 23 tons of seaweed was required to produce 1 ton of kelp ash. The kelp ash would consist of around 5% sodium carbonate.

Once the Leblanc Process became commercially viable in Britain during the 1820s, common salt replaced kelp ash as raw material for sodium carbonate. Though the price of kelp ash went into steep decline, seaweed remained the only commercial source of iodine. To supply the new industry in iodine synthesis, kelp ash production continued in some parts of West and North Scotland, North West Ireland and Guernsey. The species Saccharina latissima yielded the greatest amount of iodine (between 10 and 15 lbs per ton) and was most abundant in Guernsey. Iodine was extracted from kelp ash using a lixiviation process. As with sodium carbonate however, mineral sources eventually supplanted seaweed in iodine production.

Alginate, a kelp-derived carbohydrate, is used to thicken products such as ice cream, jelly, salad dressing, and toothpaste, as well as an ingredient in exotic dog food and in manufactured goods. Alginate powder is also used frequently in general dentistry and orthodontics for making impressions of the upper and lower arches.
Kelp polysaccharides are used in skin care as gelling ingredients and because of the benefits provided by fucoidan.

Kombu (昆布 in Japanese, and 海带 in Chinese, Saccharina japonica and others), several Pacific species of kelp, is a very important ingredient in Chinese, Japanese, and Korean cuisines. Kombu is used to flavor broths and stews  (especially dashi), as a savory garnish (tororo konbu) for rice and other dishes, as a vegetable, and a primary ingredient in popular snacks (such as tsukudani). Transparent sheets of kelp (oboro konbu) are used as an edible decorative wrapping for rice and other foods.

Kombu can be used to soften beans during cooking, and to help convert indigestible sugars and thus reduce flatulence.

In Russia, especially in the Russian Far East, and former Soviet Union countries several types of kelp are of commercial importance: Saccharina latissima, Laminaria digitata, Saccharina japonica. Known locally as "Sea Cabbage" (Морская капуста in Russian), it comes in retail trade in dried or frozen, as well as in canned form and used as filler in different types of salads, soups and pastries.

Because of its high concentration of iodine, brown kelp (Laminaria) has been used to treat goiter, an enlargement of the thyroid gland caused by a lack of iodine, since medieval times. An intake of roughly 150 micrograms of iodine per day is beneficial for preventing hypothyroidism. Overconsumption can lead to kelp-induced thyrotoxicosis.

In 2010, researchers found that alginate, the soluble fibre substance in sea kelp, was better at preventing fat absorption than most over-the-counter slimming treatments in laboratory trials.  As a food additive, it may be used to reduce fat absorption and thus obesity. Kelp in its natural form has not yet been demonstrated to have such effects.

Kelp's rich iron content can help prevent iron deficiency.

Commercial production
Commercial production of kelp harvested from its natural habitat has taken place in Japan for over a century. Many countries today produce and consume laminaria products; the largest producer is China. Laminaria japonica, the important commercial seaweed, was first introduced into China in the late 1920s from Hokkaido, Japan. Yet mariculture of this alga on a very large commercial scale was realized in China only in the 1950s. Between the 1950s and the 1980s, kelp production in China increased from about 60 to over 250,000 dry weight metric tons annually.

In history and culture

Some of the earliest evidence for human use of marine resources, coming from Middle Stone Age sites in South Africa, includes the harvesting of foods such as abalone, limpets, and mussels associated with kelp forest habitats.

In 2007, Erlandson et al. suggested that kelp forests around the Pacific Rim may have facilitated the dispersal of anatomically modern humans following a coastal route from Northeast Asia to the Americas. This "kelp highway hypothesis" suggested that highly productive kelp forests supported rich and diverse marine food webs in nearshore waters, including many types of fish, shellfish, birds, marine mammals, and seaweeds that were similar from Japan to California, Erlandson and his colleagues also argued that coastal kelp forests reduced wave energy and provided a linear dispersal corridor entirely at sea level, with few obstacles to maritime peoples. Archaeological evidence from California's Channel Islands confirms that islanders were harvesting kelp forest shellfish and fish, beginning as much as 12,000 years ago.

During the Highland Clearances, many Scottish Highlanders were moved on to areas of estates known as crofts, and went to industries such as fishing and kelping (producing soda ash from the ashes of kelp). At least until the 1840s, when there were steep falls in the price of kelp, landlords wanted to create pools of cheap or virtually free labour, supplied by families subsisting in new crofting townships. Kelp collection and processing was a very profitable way of using this labour, and landlords petitioned successfully for legislation designed to stop emigration. The profitability of kelp harvesting meant that landlords began to subdivide their land for small tenant kelpers, who could now afford higher rent than their gentleman farmer counterparts. But the economic collapse of the kelp industry in northern Scotland during the 1820s led to further emigration, especially to North America.

Natives of the Falkland Islands are sometimes nicknamed "Kelpers". This designation is primarily applied by outsiders rather than the natives themselves.

In Chinese slang, "kelp", is used to describe an unemployed returnee. It has negative overtones, implying the person is drifting aimlessly, and is also a homophonic expression (literally "sea waiting"). This expression is contrasted with the employed returnee, having a dynamic ability to travel across the ocean: the "sea turtle" and is also homophonic with another word (literally "sea return").

Conservation
Overfishing nearshore ecosystems leads to the degradation of kelp forests. Herbivores are released from their usual population regulation, leading to over-grazing of kelp and other algae. This can quickly result in barren landscapes where only a small number of species can thrive. Other major factors which threaten kelp include marine pollution and the quality of water, climate changes and certain invasive species.

Gallery

Prominent species
 Bull kelp, Nereocystis luetkeana, a northwestern American species. Used by coastal indigenous peoples to create fishing nets.
 Giant kelp, Macrocystis pyrifera, the largest seaweed. Found in the Pacific coast of North America and South America.
 Kombu, Saccharina japonica (formerly Laminaria japonica) and others, several edible species of kelp found in Japan.

Species of Laminaria in the British Isles;
 Laminaria digitata (Hudson) J.V. Lamouroux (Oarweed; Tangle)
 Laminaria hyperborea (Gunnerus) Foslie (Curvie)
 Laminaria ochroleuca Bachelot de la Pylaie
 Saccharina latissima (Linnaeus) J.V.Lamouroux (sea belt; sugar kelp; sugarwack)

Species of Laminaria worldwide, listing of species at AlgaeBase:
 Laminaria agardhii (NE. America)

 Laminaria bongardina Postels et Ruprecht (Bering Sea to California)
 Laminaria cuneifolia (NE. America)
 Laminaria dentigera Klellm. (California - America)
 Laminaria digitata (NE. America)
 Laminaria ephemera Setchell (Sitka, Alaska, to Monterey County, California - America)
 Laminaria farlowii Setchell (Santa Cruz, California, to Baja California - America)
 Laminaria groenlandica (NE. America)
 Laminaria longicruris (NE. America)
 Laminaria nigripes (NE. America)
 Laminaria ontermedia (NE. America)
 Laminaria pallida Greville ex J. Agardh (South Africa)
 Laminaria platymeris (NE. America)
 Laminaria saccharina (Linnaeus) Lamouroux, synonym of Saccharina latissima (north east Atlantic Ocean, Barents Sea south to Galicia - Spain)
 Laminaria setchellii Silva (Aleutian Islands, Alaska to Baja California America)
 Laminaria sinclairii (Harvey ex Hooker f. ex Harvey) Farlow, Anderson et Eaton (Hope Island, British Columbia to Los Angeles, California - America)
 Laminaria solidungula (NE. America)
 Laminaria stenophylla (NE. America)

Other species in the Laminariales that may be considered as kelp:
 Alaria esculenta (North Atlantic)
 Alaria marginata Post. & Rupr. (Alaska and California - America)
 Costaria costata (C.Ag.) Saunders (Japan; Alaska, California - America)
 Ecklonia brevipes J. Agardh  (Australia; New Zealand)
 Ecklonia maxima (Osbeck) Papenfuss (South Africa)
 Ecklonia radiata (C.Agardh) J. Agardh (Australia; Tasmania; New Zealand; South Africa)
 Eisenia arborea Aresch. (Vancouver Island, British Columbia, Montrey, Santa Catalina Island, California - America)
 Egregia menziesii (Turn.) Aresch.
 Hedophyllum sessile (C.Ag.) Setch (Alaska, California - America)
 Macrocystis pyrifera (Linnaeus, C.Agardh) (Australia; Tasmania and South Africa)
 Pleurophycus gardneri Setch. & Saund. (Alaska, California - America)
 Pterygophora californica Rupr. (Vancouver Island, British Columbia to Bahia del Ropsario, Baja California and California - America)

Non-Laminariales species that may be considered as kelp:
 Durvillea antarctica, Fucales (New Zealand, South America, and Australia)
 Durvillea willana, Fucales (New Zealand)
 Durvillaea potatorum (Labillardière) Areschoug, Fucales (Tasmania; Australia)

Interactions
Some animals are named after the kelp, either because they inhabit the same habitat as kelp or because they feed on kelp. These include:
 Northern kelp crab (Pugettia producta) and graceful kelp crab (Pugettia gracilis), Pacific coast of North America.
 Kelpfish (blenny) (e.g., Heterosticbus rostratus, genus Gibbonsia), Pacific coast of North America.
 Kelp goose (kelp hen) (Chloephaga hybrida), South America and the Falkland Islands
 Kelp pigeon (sheathbill) (Chionis alba and Chionis minor), Antarctic

See also
 
 
  
 
 Aquaculture of giant kelp

References

Further reading
 Druehl, L.D. 1988. Cultivated edible kelp. in Algae and Human Affairs.'' Lembi, C.A. and Waaland, J.R. (Editors) 1988..
 Erlandson, J.M., M.H. Graham, B.J. Bourque, D. Corbett, J.A. Estes, & R.S. Steneck. 2007. 	The Kelp Highway hypothesis: marine ecology, the coastal migration theory, and the peopling of the Americas. Journal of Island and Coastal Archaeology 2:161-174.
 Eger, A. M., Layton, C., McHugh, T. A, Gleason, M., and Eddy, N. (2022). Kelp Restoration Guidebook: Lessons Learned from Kelp Projects Around the World. The Nature Conservancy, Arlington, VA, USA.

External links

 
Edible seaweeds
Seaweeds